Douglas Ricketson (8 December 1939 – 18 December 2019) was an Australian professional rugby league footballer who played in the 1960s. He played in the New South Wales Rugby League (NSWRL) competition. He played for the Eastern Suburbs and Penrith clubs and was the father of Luke Ricketson.

Playing career
A , Ricketson was a member of the Eastern Suburbs side that was defeated by St George in the 1960 Grand Final. He also represented Sydney in a match against Great Britain. In 1967, Ricketson played for Penrith in their debut season in the NSWRFL premiership before a knee injury brought about an end to his career.

Post playing
Formerly an athletics coach at Waverley College, in Sydney, Ricketson spent many years coaching in country areas including Temora, where his daughter Kylie was born, Forster where his son Luke was born, and South Grafton.

Death
Ricketson died in Grafton, New South Wales following a long illness on 18 December 2019 at the age of 80.

References

1939 births
2019 deaths
Australian rugby league players
Country New South Wales rugby league team players
Sydney Roosters players
Penrith Panthers players
Rugby league centres
Rugby league players from New South Wales